Vito Emil Addabbo (born 17 July 1964) is a major general in the United States Air Force. He most recently served as a special assistant to the commander of the United States Northern Command and North American Aerospace Defense Command for reserve affairs, and prior to that was a mobilization assistant to the commander of Air Force Global Strike Command from October 2019 to December 2020, and previously was its deputy commander. Addabbo was commissioned through the ROTC at the University of Connecticut in 1986.

Awards and decorations

References

1964 births
Living people
Recipients of the Legion of Merit
United States Air Force generals